Leptolaimidae is a family of nematodes belonging to the order Araeolaimida.

Genera
Genera:
 Anguilloides
 Anomonema Hopper, 1963
 Anthonema Cobb, 1906
 Antomicron Cobb, 1920
 Leptolaimoides Vitiello, 1971
 Leptolaimus de Man, 1876
 Leptoplectonema Coomans & Raski, 1991
 Manunema Gerlach, 1957
 Paraphanolaimus Nicoletzky, 1923
 Paraplectonema Strand, 1934
 Prodomorganus Gagarin, 1993

References

Nematodes